Serudung Murut, or Serudung, is a Sabahan language spoken by members of the Tidong ethnic group in Kalabakan District, Sabah, Malaysia.

References

Paitanic languages
Languages of Sabah
Languages of Malaysia
Languages of Indonesia
Endangered Austronesian languages